The München-Haar Disciples, officially named "Disciples München-Haar e.V. von 1990", is a baseball club founded in 1990 in Haar, a suburb of Munich.  The first men's team plays in the German Baseball Bundesliga.  The first women's team plays in the first softball league.

When the team was first registered with the German Baseball Association (Deutscher Baseball & Softball Verband d.V.) in 1991, the name was misspelled "Haar Desciples eV."

Club Structure
The full club consists of 14 teams:
1st Men's Baseball, 1. Bundesliga
2nd Men's Baseball, Regionalliga
3rd Men's Baseball, Bayernliga 
1st Women's Softball, Bayernliga
2nd Women's Softball, Landesliga
Juniors U18
Youth U15
Youth Women's Softball U16
Kids Women's Softball U13
Kids Live Pitch U12
Kids Coach Pitch Baseball U9

Season by Season Performance (1st Bundesliga)

Euro League Baseball

The Haar Disciples were one of the three teams to participate in the inaugural season of the Euro League Baseball.

References

External links
Official Site

Baseball teams in Germany
Munich (district)